There are at least 101 members of the borage, mint and verbena order, Lamiales, found in Montana. Some of these species are exotics (not native to Montana) and some species have been designated as Species of Concern.

Borage
Family: Boraginaceae

Amsinckia lycopsoides, bugloss fiddle-neck
Amsinckia menziesii, small-flower fiddle-neck
Anchusa arvensis, small bugloss
Anchusa azurea, Italian bugloss
Anchusa officinalis, common bugloss
Asperugo procumbens, German madwort
Borago officinalis, common borage
Cryptantha affinis, slender cat's-eye
Cryptantha ambigua, obscure cat's-eye
Cryptantha cana, wooly cryptantha
Cryptantha celosioides, cocks-comb cat's-eye
Cryptantha cinerea, James cat's-eye
Cryptantha fendleri, Fendler cat's-eye
Cryptantha flavoculata, pale yellow cryptantha
Cryptantha humilis, round-headed cryptantha
Cryptantha kelseyana, Kelsey's cat's-eye
Cryptantha minima, little cat's-eye
Cryptantha scoparia, miner's candle
Cryptantha sobolifera, Montana cryptantha
Cryptantha spiculifera, Snake River cat's-eye
Cryptantha torreyana, Torrey's cat's-eye
Cryptantha watsonii, Watson's cat's-eye
Cynoglossum officinale, common hound's-tongue
Echium vulgare, common viper's-bugloss
Eritrichium howardii, Howard's forget-me-not
Eritrichium nanum, alpine forget-me-not
Hackelia cinerea, gray stickseed
Hackelia deflexa, northern stickseed
Hackelia floribunda, Davis Mountain stickseed
Hackelia micrantha, blue stickseed
Hackelia patens, Johnston's stickseed
Heliotropium curassavicum, seaside heliotrope
Lappula cenchrusoides, great plains stickseed
Lappula occidentalis, flatspine stickseed
Lappula squarrosa, bristly stickseed
Lithospermum arvense, corn-gromwell
Lithospermum incisum, narrow-leaved puccoon
Lithospermum ruderale, western gromwell
Mertensia alpina, alpine bluebells
Mertensia bella, Oregon bluebells
Mertensia ciliata, streamside bluebells
Mertensia lanceolata, prairie bluebells
Mertensia longiflora, long-flower bluebells
Mertensia oblongifolia, sagebrush bluebells
Mertensia paniculata, tall bluebells
Myosotis arvensis, rough forget-me-not
Myosotis asiatica, Asian forget-me-not
Myosotis laxa, small forget-me-not
Myosotis scorpioides, true forget-me-not
Myosotis stricta, small-flowered forget-me-not
Myosotis verna, early forget-me-not
Onosmodium molle, soft-hairy false gromwell
Plagiobothrys leptocladus, slender-branched popcorn-flower
Plagiobothrys scouleri, meadow popcorn-flower
Symphytum officinale, common comfrey

Mint

Family: Lamiaceae

Agastache cusickii, cusick's horsemint
Agastache foeniculum, lavender hyssop
Agastache urticifolia, nettle-leaf giant-hyssop
Ajuga reptans, common bugle
Dracocephalum parviflorum, American dragonhead
Dracocephalum thymiflorum, thyme-leaf dragon-head
Glechoma hederacea, ground-ivy
Hedeoma drummondii, drummond's false pennyroyal
Hedeoma hispida, rough false pennyroyal
Hyssopus officinalis, hyssop
Lamium amplexicaule, common deadnettle
Lamium purpureum, purple deadnettle
Leonurus cardiaca, common mother-wort
Lycopus americanus, American bugleweed
Lycopus asper, rough bugleweed
Lycopus uniflorus, northern bugleweed
Marrubium vulgare, common hoarhound
Mentha arvensis, wild mint
Mentha spicata, spearmint
Monarda fistulosa, beebalm
Nepeta cataria, catnip
Origanum vulgare, oregano
Physostegia parviflora, purple dragon-head
Physostegia virginiana, false dragon-head
Prunella vulgaris, self-heal
Prunella vulgaris subsp. lanceolata, lance selfheal
Prunella vulgaris subsp. vulgaris, common selfheal
Salvia nemorosa, wood sage
Salvia reflexa, lance-leaved sage
Salvia sclarea, clary sage
Salvia × sylvestris, hybrid sage
Satureja acinos, basil thyme
Satureja douglasii, yerba buena
Satureja vulgaris, field basil
Scutellaria galericulata, hooded skullcap
Stachys palustris, marsh hedge-nettle
Teucrium canadense, American germander
Thymus praecox, mother-of-thyme

Verbena

Family: Verbenaceae

Verbena bipinnatifida, Dakota vervain
Verbena bracteata, large-bract verbena
Verbena hastata, swamp verbena
Verbena stricta, hoary verbena

Further reading

See also
 List of dicotyledons of Montana
 List of Scrophulariales of Montana

Notes

Montana